The Wexford Senior Football Championship is an annual Gaelic football competition contested by top-tier Wexford GAA clubs. The Wexford County Board of the Gaelic Athletic Association has organised it since 1886.

The 2022 champions are Castletown Liam Mellows who beat defending champions Shelmaliers by 0-13 to 0-09 in Wexford Park on 16 October 2022.

Honours
The trophy presented to the winners is the ? The winners of the Wexford Championship qualify to represent their county in the Leinster Senior Club Football Championship, the winner of which progresses to the All-Ireland Senior Club Football Championship.

List of finals
(r) = replay

Wins listed by club

References

External links
Official Wexford Website
Wexford on Hoganstand
Wexford Club GAA

 
Wexford GAA club championships
Senior Gaelic football county championships